Errazurizia (dunebroom) is a genus of flowering plants in the family Fabaceae. It belongs to the subfamily Faboideae.

Species
Errazurizia comprises the following species:
 Errazurizia benthamii (Brandegee) I.M. Johnst.

 Errazurizia megacarpa (S. Watson) I.M. Johnst.
 Errazurizia multifoliolata (Clos) I.M. Johnst.
 Errazurizia rotundata (Wooton) Barneby

References

External links

Amorpheae
Fabaceae genera